XHME-FM is a radio station on 89.5 FM in Puerto Vallarta, Jalisco. The station is owned by Grupo ACIR and carries its Match pop format.

History
XHME received its concession on March 1, 1978. It was owned by Manuel Ayala Estrada. By the 1990s, it was owned by ACIR.

Match 

On December 26, 2019, Disney and ACIR announced they were mutually ending their relationship, which had covered twelve Mexican cities. Ten of the twelve Radio Disney stations, including XHME, were transitioned to ACIR's replacement pop format, Match.

References

Radio stations in Jalisco
Grupo ACIR